The 2018 Indiana Wesleyan Wildcats football team represent Indiana Wesleyan University, located in Marion, Indiana, in a historic first year of football as participants in the 2018 NAIA football season. They are led by head coach Jordan Langs, hired in 2016 as the first head coach in the history of Indiana Wesleyan football.  The Wildcats play their home games at Wildcat Stadium as associate members of the Mid-States Football Association (MSFA) Mideast League (MEL).  For the 2018 season, the Wildcats' games will not be counted in the conference standings.

Schedule 
(7-3 overall, no conference schedule this season)

Game summaries

Taylor
The first-ever football game was played at home against the Taylor Trojans, IWU's cross-County (Grant) neighbor from Upland, IN.  The game was a pre-game sellout online, as confirmed by the announced attendance of 6,500.  The Wildcats scored the first touchdown in the history of their new stadium, and they led 14-0 at the end of the first quarter.  But the experience of Taylor took over in the second quarter, and the Trojans led 21-14 at halftime.  The Trojans eventually prevailed by a final score of 43-31.

The game opened with IWU winning the coin flip and deferring possession until the second half.  The two teams traded punts, and Taylor started their second drive.  After 3 successive downs that failed to gain a first down, Taylor punted a second time from  their own 25 yard line.  The punt was shanked badly, traveling 7 yards to give IWU possession at the Taylor 32 yard line.  The Wildcats capitalized immediately, throwing a 32-yard TD pass to put them ahead 7-0.  The next Taylor drive also stalled and ended with a punt.  The Wildcats responded with a 68-yard punt return.  The extra point was good once again, and IWU led 14-0.

Taylor took the next kickoff and marched 75 yards for their first score.  On the following drive, IWU methodically marched down the field.  The drive ended with a missed 34-yard field goal attempt.  Taylor capitalized on the miss with another TD drive, this one culminating in a 63-yard pass.  The extra point was good, and the score was tied 14-14 with 2:55 remaining in the first half.

IWU failed to move on their next drive, and they kicked the ball back to Taylor with 1:07 remaining.  An efficient pass offense moved the ball down field, and Taylor scored and took a 21-14 lead into the half.

IWU received the second half kick and failed to advance the ball in 3 plays.  Their punt attempt from the 20-yard line was blocked, and Taylor recovered the ball in the end zone for another quick touchdown.  From this point throughout the second half, Taylor maintained control of the game.  Both teams added scores to bring the final score to 43-31.

The IWU offense had some highlights in the game.  All 4 of their TD's were scored on long plays.  Besides the two first half touchdowns, the Wildcats' Dontae Henderson had TD catches of 79 and 57 yards.  For the game, Henderson had 6 catches totaling 178 yards, or an average of 29.7 yards each.  QB Zack Blair completed 18 of 34 passes for 309 yards, 3 TD's and no interceptions.

The historic event was filled with much pageantry to entertain the sell-out crowd of 6,500 people.  Among the activities was the delivery of the game balls by a team of 3 skydivers.  They exited their plane, a World War II museum-worthy DC-9, high above Wildcat Stadium before drifting on the wind and landing near the 50-yard line.

Anderson
The first-ever win in Wildcat football occurred in a 61-6 road win over Anderson.  In a game that featured an abundance of rain, the Wildcats stuck to the ground for most of their attack.  The strategy worked as the Wildcats amassed over 500 yards of rushing and 600 yards of total offense.  The defense was equally dominant, holding the Ravens to 48 yards of total offense.

Trinity Bible
The first-ever home win in Wildcat football occurred in an 80-6 victory over Trinity Bible College.  The game showcased a quick-strike offense that scored 10 touchdowns and a field goal in drives that were each 7 plays or less.  The offense did most of the damage, and the defense contributed a pick-6 interception of their own.  Including the interception, the team scored 6 times in the first quarter on drives that each consumed 1:33 or less.  For the game, the time of possession favored Trinity Bible, with IWU possessing the ball only 27:28 of the 60-minute total.  Once again, the Wildcats stuck to the ground for most of their attack.  They amassed 440 yards of rushing out of 494 yards of total offense.  The defense was also dominating, holding the Lions to 120 yards of total offense, including only 17 yards rushing on 34 attempts.

Lindenwood–Belleville

Indiana Wesleyan continued its historic first season of play with what would have been their first win against a conference opponent.  The Wildcats beat MSFA Mideast League member Lindenwood–Belleville 44–7 in a home match that did not count in conference standings—the Wildcats will not begin conference play until the 2019 season.

The Wildcat offense rolled up 459 yards of offense, split as 264 yards rushing and 195 yards passing.  IWU controlled the game with ball control that held the ball for 40:25 of the 60-minute game.  Scoring came in pairs with two rushing touchdowns each by Tyrell Phelps and Joshua McKenzie and two touchdown passes by Zach Blair.  A field goal and one failed extra-point conversion completed the scoring picture.

The defense held Lindenwood–Belleville's offense to 261 yards, including 215 yards passing and only 46 yards rushing.

St. Francis (IL)

The first IWU Homecoming game was an exciting match that featured St. Francis scores and Indiana Wesleyan responses.  Ultimately, the game was decided by a missed extra point attempt by St. Francis.  St. Francis scored first, and IWU tied it 7-7.  That sequence was replayed, bringing the score to 14-14. St. Francis then scored a third touchdown.  But this time, the extra point attempt was missed.  After the  Wildcats responded with another score, their extra point gave them the lead for the first time, 21-20.  This sequence was then continued two more times to arrive at the final score.

The game's outcome was in doubt right to the very end.  Late in the 4th quarter, IWU  fumbled the ball at the 50-yard line.  St. Francis recovered the ball and had 2:06 left on the clock.  St. Francis drove the ball to the 21-yard line before a sack moved the ball back to the 25-yard line.  With :03 seconds left on the clock, St. Francis attempted a 42-yard field goal.  But the attempt sailed wide as time expired, and the Cardinals had their 4th win in a row.

The game was a high-yardage offensive battle.  St. Francis gained more total yardage, 517 to 456.  This was attained with more rushing yards, 238 vs. 213, and more passing yards, 279 to 243.  But the stat that mattered the most, the final score, was tilted by one in IWU's favor.

Lawrence Tech

IWU hit the road for the first of four consecutive away games.  The opponent for today's game, the Lawrence Tech Blue Devils, are also playing in their first season of organized football.  The game in Southfield, Michigan will be the first of a pair of home-and-home matches between the two teams that will begin play in the Mid-States Football Association's Mideast League in 2019.

IWU came away with the win, by a final score of 38-24.  Though the Wildcats held their opponent to only 52 yards rushing (on only 18 attempts), Lawrence Tech won the passing portion of the contest with 262 yards in the air.  This was because IWU only attempted 22 passes, completing 11 of them, compared to 27 of 42 for the Blue Devils.  For the game, IWU gained 402 yards of total offense while giving up 314 yards to the home team.

The scoring went back and forth for most of the first half.  At the end of two quarters, IWU led 16-10.  Lawrence Tech scored first in the third quarter to take the lead, 17-16.  But the Wildcats scored the next 22 points to take control of the contest.  One final score by Lawrence Tech put the final score on the board.

With the win today, IWU guaranteed that their opening season would not finish with a losing record.  IWU continues the season next week in Adrian, Michigan against #23-ranked Siena Heights.  This will be the first ranked opponent in IWU's brief football history.

Siena Heights

This week, the Wildcats met their first ranked opponent in football history.  They traveled to Adrian, Michigan to face the #23 Siena Heights Saints in a game that will become a conference match next season.  Siena Heights came into the game with a highly regarded defense that had lost only once this season, an overtime loss last week in a visit to the two-time defending national champion Saint Francis Cougars.  Their defense was on display today as the Saints built a 24-0 halftime lead.  The Wildcats finally got on the scoreboard in the third quarter, a quarter that saw them outscore the Saints 10-0.  But in the end, IWU lost by a final score of 31-10.  The loss snapped a 5-game winning streak and was the first time the Wildcatss lost a game away from their home campus.

The Wildcatss outpassed the home team during the game, largely due to choosing the pass option about twice as often as the Saints.  IWU accumulated 223 yards through the air while yielding only 157 yards to Siena Heights.  But it was on the ground where the strength of the Saints' defense was evident.  IWU ran 27 rushing plays for a net gain of 28 yards; that total included their quarterback being sacked 4 times for 31 yards of losses.  In comparison, Siena Heights ran the ball 51 times for 221 net yards.  Thus, they outproduced the Wildcats with 378 yards of total offense while holding IWU to 251 yards.

Another tough opponent will be seen next week when the Wildcatss travel to Bourbonnais, Illinois to play the team from Olivet Nazarene University.

Olivet Nazarene

The Wildcats took to the road for another MSFA crossover game against the Olivet Nazarene Tigers in the home team's Homecoming Game. Olivet entered the game undefeated in Midwest League play, and they will be playing rival Saint Xavier for the division championship in next week's game.  The Wildcats walked away with their biggest road win to date, by the final score of 40-36.  The loss was the fourth of the season for the Tigers, with the three prior defeats each coming at the hands of NAIA Top-25-ranked opponents.

The Wildcats showed some team character with a strong second-half effort.  Trailing 28-17 at the half, the IWU defense responded by holding Olivet to a single touchdown and 2-point conversion after the break.  A safety and three touchdowns of their own equaled 23 points and a 4-point margin of victory.

The winning score was something of a trick play as receiver Brayden Smith tossed a 36-yard touchdown pass to Dontae Henderson with 9:52 left to play in the game.  From that point to the end, a defensive struggle kept additional points off the board and preserved the win for the Wildcats.

The game was highlighted by a strong performance by IWU quarterback Zach Blair.  Blair completed 26 of 38 pass attempts for 359 yards and 3 touchdowns and 1 interception.  Besides his touchdown toss, Smith caught two of the Blair touchdown passes.  It was the second time this season that Blair had surpassed the 300-yard threshold.

The final game of the Wildcats' four-game road trip will be next week.  IWU will travel to Ann Arbor, Michigan to face another Top-25-ranked host, the #15 Concordia Cardinals.

Concordia (MI)

The Wildcats took to the road for a match against next year's conference foe, the Concordia Cardinals.  The 15th-ranked Cardinals showed their strength by emerging with a 55-7 home victory.  The Cardinals put the game away early.  They opened the game with a touchdown drive that began with great field position, the result of a 70-yard kickoff return.  It took the Cardinals just four plays to take the lead 7-0.  Moments later, the lead was doubled as IWU watched a pick-6 interception get returned by a Cardinal defender on just their third play on offense.

The stingy Concordia defense frustrated the Wildcats all day long.  IWU ended with 167 yards of total offense, hurting their productivity with 5 intercepted passes.  Concordia recorded 353 yards of offense without recording any turnovers.  Concordia controlled the ball, holding it for 31:01 compared to 28:59 for the Wildcats.

Lawrence Tech

The Wildcats wrapped their inaugural season of play with the second game of a home-and-home pair against the other new team in the league, Lawrence Tech.  IWU opened the first quarter with a 17-0 lead, and the Wildcats sailed home for their second win of the season against the visitors.

The game was actually fairly even offensively, with Lawrence Tech winning the total yardage, 441-404.  IWU outrushed the visitors, 250 yards to 90 yards; but Lawrence Tech outpassed the Wildcats 351 yards to 154 yards.  The Lawrence Tech effort was slowed by losing 2 out of 3 fumbles and 1 pass interception on the day; IWU added no turnovers of their own.

With the first season now in the record books, each team will return to action in 2019 as full members of the Mideast League of the Mid-States Football Association.  Conference games and crossover matches will be played against MSFA opponents.

References

Indiana Wesleyan
Indiana Wesleyan Wildcats football seasons
Indiana Wesleyan Wildcats football